The Aurora Borealis Cup is the trophy awarded to the  Finnish Champion in women's ice hockey, the victorious team of the Naisten Liiga playoffs. The Aurora Borealis Cup was created to honor the quality of play in Naisten Liiga and as a symbol of support in the promotion of women's ice hockey.

Project 
The trophy had its genesis in a moment of inspiration that struck Christopher Shapardanov, Canadian Ambassador to Finland, in September 2009, after a visit to the Suomen Jääkiekkomuseo (Finnish Ice Hockey Museum and Hockey Hall of Fame) in Tampere and conversation with Kimmo Leinonen, chairman of the Suomen Jääkiekkomuseoyhdistys ry:n (Finnish Ice Hockey Museum Association), and Jyrki Lumme.

The project was then commissioned through the fundraising efforts of the Finnish-Canadian community with significant financial contributions from Osuuspankki. Several Canadian former players, including Sami Jo Small and Darren Boyko, contributed to fundraising efforts and other aspects of implementation of the project.

The design and manufacture was executed by Toronto-based Awardco. The completed Aurora Borealis Cup was presented by Ambassador Shapardanov and received by Kalervo Kummola, Chairman of the Finnish Ice Hockey Association, on 21 March 2011. An exact replica of the Aurora Borealis Cup was also given to the Suomen Jääkiekkomuseo, where it's on permanent display in a place of prominence opposite the original Kanada-malja.

Design 
The design of the trophy pays homage to the natural and cultural similarities between Finland and Canada. Both Arctic nations are renowned for the ability to observe the Aurora Borealis, also called the Northern Lights, after which the cup is named. Likewise, the choice of materials celebrate the countries' natural affinity. The metal elements of the trophy are Canadian silver, the wood is maple, and a ring of labradorite circles the foot of the cup. The cup itself depicts the Northern Lights over a coniferous forest landscape. Text documenting the donation of the trophy is engraved in four languages on the upper tier of the base to highlight the official bilingualism of each country; the text appears in Finnish and Swedish, the official languages of Finland, and in English and French, the official languages of Canada. The lower tiers of the base feature 60 metal plates, originally intended to be engraved with the names of the champion teams until the plates were filled in 2070.

Championship history

Finnish Champions by season 

Notes:

Sources:

References

External links 
 League information and statistics from Eliteprospects.com and Eurohockey.com and Hockeyarchives.info (in French)

Women's ice hockey competitions in Finland
Ice hockey trophies and awards
Naisten Liiga (ice hockey) trophies and awards
Naisten Liiga (ice hockey) playoffs